Fiat was a French professional cycling team that existed in 1978 and 1979. It was sponsored by Fiat Automobiles.

References

Cycling teams based in France
Defunct cycling teams based in France
1978 establishments in France
1979 disestablishments in France
Cycling teams established in 1978
Cycling teams disestablished in 1979